Abul-Qasim al-Hussein bin Mufaddal bin Muhammad, better known as Raghib [Raaghib] Isfahani, was an eleventh-century Muslim scholar of Qur'anic exegesis and the Arabic language.

Biography
Al-Raghib Al-Isfahani - meaning "the Isfahanian monk" - was born in Isfahan as his name suggests, though his exact date of birth is not known.

He died in the Hijri year 502, corresponding to 1108 on the Gregorian calendar.

Al-Isfahani's theological stance seems to have been close to that of the Ash'ari school. In one of his works entitled al-I'tiqadat, Al-Isfahani attacks both the Mu'tazila and the Shi'a showing that questions about his adherence to either of these positions is groundless.

Al-Isfahani was opposed to the emanationism of the Brethren of Purity, preferring creationism instead. The concept of justice, according to al-Isfahani's definition, is "equal retaliation" for wrongdoing.

Works
His work covered topics ranging from ethics to linguistics to Muslim philosophy. He authored a commentary on the Quran, Mufradāt alfāẓ al-Qurʾān. One of his most famous works was Al-Mufradat fi Gharib al-Quran.

As a man of letters, al-Isfahani was also well-versed in Arabic literature. His literary anthology, which was carefully organized by topic, carried much weight and respect in intellectual circles. He was also noted as an early Muslim writer on the topic of blending religious and philosophical ethics.

See also

 List of Ash'aris and Maturidis
 List of Islamic scholars

References

Bibliography
THE ETHICAL PHILOSOPHY OF AL-RĀGHIB AL-ISFAHĀNĪ, Journal of Islamic Studies (1995) 6 (1): 51-75. Oxford Journals.

Asharis
Shafi'is
Sunni Muslim scholars of Islam
Quranic exegesis scholars
Year of birth unknown
1100s deaths